Moses Chan Ho (born 16 April 1971) is an actor from Hong Kong.

Career and personal life
Chan lived and studied in Australia (Melbourne, Brisbane, and Sydney) for 10 years prior to returning to Hong Kong to embark on his acting career. On 17 November 2007, he won both the Best Actor and Most Favourite Character Awards at the TVB 40th Anniversary Award Show for his character Tong Chi On in the popular drama series Heart of Greed.

He was a judge in Miss Hong Kong 2007 and Miss Chinese International 2008. Chan married fellow TVB actress Aimee Chan in Paris, France in June 2013. The couple have two sons and one daughter : Aiden Joshua Chan (born 4 December 2013), Nathan Lucas Chan (born 26 February 2015) and Camilla Chan (born 27 April 2016).

There has been a rumour has emerged that Chan is also planning to leave TVB, and has already planned to set up an agency with former TVB manager Chan Ka Lei and actress Tavia Yeung. However, when asked to address the rumours, Chan replied, "I am so sorry. I can't disclose anything for now."

Chan recently denied rumours that he will be making his departure from TVB to sign with a different management company. Chan was recently rumoured to have been approached by Louis Koo's company, One Cool Film to sign a contract with them. In addition, Stephen Shiu Jr. is also reportedly interested to get Moses to join his peers like Julian Cheung and Louis Cheung and be a part of HMV Digital China.

But when asked about it, Moses assured that he will be staying with the company for a long while. "I have already signed a new contract with TVB. Our cooperation has been great and I don't see any need for me to change my working environment," he said. Chan also stated that he has no clue whether or not the aforementioned companies have been interested in him, though added that he is honoured if they are. As for now, Chan stressed that he will just focus on filming his new drama "Assassin", which is scheduled for a 2019 release.

Filmography

Television dramas

Film

Awards

TVB Anniversary Awards
2002:  「Most Improved Actor 」(Where the Legend Begins – Chou Pei)
2004:  「Favourite Character」(War and Beauty – Kong Wu)
2007:  「Most Favourite Male Character in Drama」(Heart of Greed – Tong Chi On/ Dak Dak Dei)
2007:  「Best Actor in a Leading Role」(Heart of Greed –  Tong Chi On/ Dak Dak Dei)
2010:  「Best Performance of the Year」

Astro Wah Lai Toi Drama Awards
2006:  「My Favourite Character」(Love Bond – Sit Sui)
2006:  「My Favourite Couple」(Love Bond – Moses Chan as Sit Sui & Bernice Liu as Gei Mei Lai)
2006:  「My Favourite Actor in Leading Role」(The Gentle Crackdown – Sui Dong Lau)
2007:  「My Favourite Character」(Land of Wealth – Pak Tsun/Fan Chi Chai)
2008:  「My Favourite Character」(Heart of Greed – Tong Chi Onn/Dak Dak Dei)
2008:  「My Favourite Leading Actor」(Heart of Greed – Tong Chi Onn/Dak Dak Dei)
2010:  「My Favourite Character」(Can't Buy Me Love – Kam Dor-Luk)
2010:  「My Favourite Leading Actor」(Can't Buy Me Love – Kam Dor-Luk)

Hong Kong Next Magazine TV Awards
2003:「Top Ten Artistes」Ranked #05
2005:「Top Ten Artistes」Ranked #07
2005:「Sinomax Sponsorship Award」
2005:「Omiz Sponsorship Award」
2006:「Top Ten Artistes」Ranked #10
2007:「Top Ten Artistes」Ranked #09
2007:「TITONI Sponsorship Award」
2008:「Top Ten Artistes」Ranked #03
2008:「SVENSON Sponsorship Award」
2009:「Top Ten Artistes」Ranked #04
2009:「SVENSON Sponsorship Award」
2010:「Top Ten Artistes」Ranked #05
2010:「SVENSON Sponsorship Award」

Other awards
2002:《Mingpao Magazines Awards》「Best Actor on Television」 (Where the Legend Begins – Chou Pei)
2006:《Metroshowbiz TV awards》 「Top 10 TV Actors and Actresses」
2006:《China Hunan TV Station》「Best Actor in War and Beauty」(War and Beauty – Kong Wu)
2007:《China/HK 10th Entertainment Awards》「Most Fashion Actor」(Land of Wealth – Pak Tsun/Fan Chi Chai)
2008:《HKFDA 20th Annual Best Dressed Personalities Awards》 「Top Ten Best Dressed Personalities Awards」
2010:《StarHub TVB Awards》「My Favourite TVB Male TV Character」- Kam Wing-Ka (Moonlight Resonance)
2011:《StarHub TVB Awards》「My Favourite TVB Actor 2011」
2011:《StarHub TVB Awards》「My Favourite TVB On Screen Couple」(Along with Charmaine Sheh)
2012:《StarHub TVB Awards》「My Favourite TVB Male TV Character」- Sung Yi-Long (When Heaven Burns)
2012:《StarHub TVB Awards》「My Favourite TVB Drama」(When Heaven Burns)

Publications
 《給咖啡偷一杯時間》 My Coffee Guide (2009)

References

External links 
 MC Hall Moses Chan Official Website
 Official TVB Blog of Moses Chan
 
 

|-
! colspan="3" style="background: #DAA520;" | Asian Television Awards

|-
! colspan="3" style="background: #DAA520;" | TVB Anniversary Awards

|-

|-

|-
! colspan="3" style="background: #DAA520;" | Ming Pao Anniversary Awards
|-

|-

|-
! colspan="3" style="background: #DAA520;" | Astro Awards

|-

1971 births
Living people
20th-century Hong Kong male actors
21st-century Hong Kong male actors
Hong Kong Buddhists
Hong Kong male film actors
Hong Kong male models
Hong Kong male singers
Hong Kong male television actors
TVB veteran actors